Deepanayakaswamy Jain Temple is a Jain temple dedicated to the deity Jain, located near Arasavanangadu in  Kumbakonam-Tiruvarur road in Tiruvarur District, Tamil Nadu, India

Other Jain Temples
There are also Jain temples in Kumbakonam, Mannargudi, Thanjavur and other places in Tamil Nadu.

Structure of the temple
The temple has sanctum sanctorum, Rajagopura, artha mandapa, front mandapa.maha mandapa and vimana.  The gopura has three tiers, with the stucco figures of Tirttankaras. In the Vimana, Upapeeta, Peeta, Kumudha, Patti and Prastara are found. At the entrance of the arthamandapa, guardian deities are found on either side. Near to them bronze sculpture of Tirttankara is found. In the entrance of the Mahamandapa also guardian deities are found. On the right side of the mandapa Sruthaskanda, Sasanadeva, Sasanadevi, Kshetrabalar and Tirttankara are found. Shrimes of Dharmadevi, Adhinatha, Jwalamalini and Brahmadevar are also found. Near the Rajagopura, Mutt is found.

Presiding deity
The presiding deity is known as Deepanayakaswamy and Deepanathar. As the presiding deity is called as Deepanayakaswamy the place was to be known as Deepankudi.

Inscription
During renovation of the Kailasanatha Temple near the Jain Temple an inscription of Rajendra Chola II was found, in September 2009. It notes about the donation offered. In the first part of the inscription  one Nandhian has been referred. This Nandhian belonged to Jainism.

Festivals
Festivals are held regularly in this temple. For some years, during the last Sundays of December Tamil Jains celebrate Gnana Deepa Festival, lighting 1008 lamps.

See also
Arihant (Jainism)
God in Jainism
Jainism and non-creationism
Tijara Jain Temple
Jainism in Tamil Nadu
 Tamil Jain

Reference

Jain temples in Tamil Nadu
Tiruvarur district